Craig Farrell (born 8 October 1981) is an English former professional rugby league player who played in the 2000s. He also played representative rugby for Great Britain Universities.

Background
Farrell was born in Widnes, Cheshire, England, and he was a pupil at Graham School, Scarborough, North Yorkshire. He later attended York St. John University.

Career
In 2006, he began a career as a Physical education Teacher, based at Graham School Specialist Science & Arts College, in Scarborough, North Yorkshire, in conjunction with his rugby league career. Farrell retired from professional rugby league at the end of 2008, at the age of 27, due to the cumulative effects of injury. In 2019 he began teaching at St. Augustine's Catholic School, also in Scarborough.

References

External links
 (archived by web.archive.org) Batley Bulldogs profile

1981 births
Living people
Batley Bulldogs players
Doncaster R.L.F.C. players
English rugby league players
Schoolteachers from Yorkshire
Hull F.C. players
Hull Kingston Rovers players
Rugby league centres
Rugby league players from Widnes
Rugby league second-rows
Sportspeople from Scarborough, North Yorkshire
York City Knights players
Rugby articles needing expert attention
Alumni of York St John University